Elephant Point is a small predominantly ice-free promontory projecting 2 km into Bransfield Strait at the south extremity of the west half of Livingston Island in the South Shetland Islands, Antarctica. The point forms the southwest side of the entrance to Kavarna Cove, and is surmounted by Rotch Dome on the north. Ice-free surface area . Dryad Lake is situated on the west side of the point. The area was visited by early 19th century sealers.

The feature is named after the Elephant seal species.

Location
British mapping in 1821 and 1968, Spanish in 1991, and Bulgarian in 2005 and 2009.

Maps
 L.L. Ivanov et al. Antarctica: Livingston Island and Greenwich Island, South Shetland Islands. Scale 1:100000 topographic map. Sofia: Antarctic Place-names Commission of Bulgaria, 2005.
 Antarctic Digital Database (ADD). Scale 1:250000 topographic map of Antarctica. Scientific Committee on Antarctic Research (SCAR). Since 1993, regularly upgraded and updated.
 L.L. Ivanov. Antarctica: Livingston Island and Smith Island. Scale 1:100000 topographic map. Manfred Wörner Foundation, 2017.

Notes

References
 Elephant Point. SCAR Composite Antarctic Gazetteer

Headlands of Livingston Island